The 2019 Oldham Metropolitan Borough Council election took place on 2 May 2019 to elect members of Oldham Metropolitan Borough Council in England. The election took place on the same day as other local elections in England.

Overall results 
Vote share changes compared to 2018.

Ward results
Councillors seeking re-election are marked with an asterisk; they were last elected in 2015 and changes are compared to that year's election.

Alexandra

Chadderton Central

Chadderton North

Chadderton South

Coldhurst
Montaz Azad was elected for Labour in 2015 but was suspended from the party. They stood as an independent; their individual change and Labour's change are based on the same 2015 result.

Crompton

Failsworth East

Failsworth West

Hollinwood

Medlock Vale
Kaiser Rehman was elected for Labour in 2015 but left the party. They stood as an independent; their individual change and Labour's change are based on the same 2015 result.

Royton North

Royton South

Saddleworth North

Saddleworth South

Saddleworth West & Lees

Shaw

St. James

St. Mary's

Waterhead

Werneth

References

Oldham
Oldham Council elections
2010s in Greater Manchester
May 2019 events in the United Kingdom